Danielle Marie Campbell (born January 30, 1995) is an American actress. She is known for her starring roles as Jessica Olson in the 2010 Disney Channel Original Movie Starstruck, Simone Daniels in the 2011 Disney film Prom, Davina Claire in the 2013 CW television drama series The Originals and Kayla Powell and Olivia Moon in the 2018 CBS All Access television psychological thriller series Tell Me a Story.

Early life 
Campbell is from Hinsdale, Illinois. Her parents are Georganne and John Campbell, and she has a younger brother. She was discovered in a hair salon in Chicago at age ten.

Career 
Campbell's first acting role was as a guest star in five episodes of Prison Break. She also appeared in a nationwide commercial for Build-A-Bear Workshop and played the character of Darla in the 2008 movie The Poker House. In 2010, she appeared in the Disney Channel television series Zeke and Luther as Dani, before starring in the television movie Starstruck with Sterling Knight the same year. Upon Starstruck'''s release, she signed a development deal with Disney. She starred in the movie Prom, released on April 29, 2011, co-starring with Nicholas Braun, Nolan Sotillo, and Aimee Teegarden.

In 2013, she was cast in a starring role on the television series The Originals as a powerful sixteen-year-old witch named Davina. In late 2013, producers of the 2015 film 16 South announced that Campbell would star in the film alongside Luke Benward. In April 2015, Campbell shot the movie Race To Redemption in which she starred alongside Aiden Flowers and Luke Perry; the movie was released in 2016. Campbell was also cast as Ellie Reed in the 2016 television series SINs, and Maddy in the 2017 Fine Brothers production F the Prom. In March 2018, she appeared in the music video for "Better With You" by Jesse McCartney.

In 2018, Campbell had a recurring role in the second season of the Freeform television series Famous in Love. In June 2018 she was cast in a starring role in the CBS All Access television drama series Tell Me a Story''. In 2021, Campbell starred in the Broadway production of Alice Childress's Trouble in Mind.

Personal life
Campbell lives in Los Angeles, California.

Filmography

References

External links
 
 

1995 births
Living people
21st-century American actresses
Actresses from Chicago
American child actresses
American film actresses
American television actresses
People from Hinsdale, Illinois